Sahkutumb Sahaparivar is a Marathi language drama which airs on Star Pravah. It is a remake of the Tamil serial Pandian Stores. It stars Sunil Barve and Nandita Dhuri-Patkar. The show is produced by Ranjit Thakur and Hemant Ruparel under the banner of Frames Production.

Plot 
The show revolves around Sarita and Suryakant, the owner of a Jay Bhawani departmental store, and his family. The show is describing importance of family and their relationships. Suryakant is the head of the family. He has three younger brothers, Vaibhav, Omkar and Prashant. These three brothers and their mother lead a happy life. Suryakant marries Sarita.

Sarita decides not to have children and wants to take care of Suryakant's brothers. She takes care of everyone in the family and always bees there for them. Then, due to some circumstances, Vaibhav marries Avni and Prashant marries Anjali. Now, this drama is about how Sarita maintains the family without any problems and facing all obstacles and keeps the family running happily. This is a heart-touching drama because each and every point is related and seen in a normal family.

Cast

Main 
 Sunil Barve as Suryakant "Surya" More – Owner of Bhawani Stores; Laxmi's eldest son; Vaibhav, Prashant and Omkar's brother; Sarita's husband. He is strict but kind man who supports his family by sacrificing his own wishes.
 Nandita Dhuri Patkar as Sarita "Sari" More – Suryakant's wife. She is kind, generous and strives to keep the family united and like a mother-figure to Vaibhav, Prashant and Omkar.

Recurring 
 Amey Barve / Nimish Kulkarni as Lavdya Vaibhav "Vaibhya" More – Laxmi's second son; Suryakant, Prashant and Omkar's brother; Avni's husband. He is educated and smart and he supports his family by opposing his wife.
 Sakshi Gandhi as Avni More – Sarjerao's daughter; Vaibhav's wife. She tries to get adjusted in the family as she belongs to a rich family, but continuously fails and insults others but she is clean by heart.
 Akash Nalawade as Lavdya Prashant "Pashya" More – Laxmi's third son; Suryakant, Vaibhav and Omkar's brother; Anjali's husband. He has a love hate relationship with Anji but he always supports her. He is an illiterate and dumb guy.
 Komal Kumbhar as Anjali "Anji" Dhawale More – Asha and Dhananjay's daughter; Prashant's wife. She has love-hate relationship with Prashant but she always supports him.
 Akash Shinde as Lavdya Omkar "Onkya" More – Laxmi's youngest son; Suryakant, Vaibhav and Prashant's brother; Pooja's husband. He is mischievous but is loyal to his brothers.
 Pooja Purandare as Pooja More – Omkar's wife.
 Annapurna Bhairi as Laxmi More – Suryakant, Vaibhav, Prashant and Omkar's mother. She is a paralyzed lady.
 Kishori Ambiye as Asha Dhawale – Dhananjay's wife; Anjali's mother; Sarita's aunt. She hates More Family especially Sarita and Prashant.
 Santosh Patil / Mahesh Ghag as Dhananjay Dhawale – Asha's husband; Anjali's father; Sarita's uncle. 
 Bhagyashri Pawar as Guddi – Anjali's friend; Sarita's sister-figure. She always supports Sarita and Anji.
 Sayali Sambhare as Kavita – Govind's wife. She also hates Sarita and supports Mami in her plans.
 Bhushan Patil as Sarjerao – Avni's father. He is a rich politician. He hates the More family because he thinks they have brainwashed his daughter to marry Vaibhav and therefore she married him.
 Suhas Paranjpe as Akkasaheb – Sarjerao's sister; Avni's aunt. She hates the More family like Sarjerao and tries to create a misunderstanding between them.
 Shweta Mehendale as Jyoti – Anjali's cousin.

Reception

Mahaepisode (1 hour) 
 13 September 2020
 1 November 2020
 6 December 2020
 10 January 2021
 28 February 2021
 28 March 2021
 8 August 2021
 19 September 2021
 17 October 2021
 5 December 2021
 9 January 2022
 6 March 2022
 12 June 2022
 18 September 2022
 6 November 2022
 25 December 2022
 15 January 2023
 26 February 2023

Ratings

Awards

References

External links 
 
 Sahkutumb Sahaparivar at Disney+ Hotstar

Marathi-language television shows
2020 Indian television series debuts
Star Pravah original programming
Marathi-language television series based on Tamil-language television series